BelgiumExel was an airline based in Brussels, Belgium. It operated charter flights to Africa, Asia and the Caribbean as part of holiday packages for Thomas Cook AG. The airline was the sister airline of HollandExel.

History

The airline was established and started operations on February 15, 2004. It was owned by ExelAviation Group, and services ceased on January 31, 2005. In May 2005, ExelAviation Group declared bankruptcy.

Fleet
The BelgiumExel fleet consisted the following aircraft:

See also
List of defunct airlines of Belgium

References

External links

BelgiumExel 
BelgiumExel Fleet Detail 
Bankruptcy Information

Defunct airlines of Belgium
Airlines established in 2004
ExelAviation
Airlines disestablished in 2005
Belgian companies established in 2004